All Japan Intercollegiate Volleyball Championship (全日本バレーボール大学男女選手権大会 Zen Nippon Barēbōru Daigaku Danjo Senshuken Taikai) is an annual nationwide intercollegiate volleyball tournament. It is the largest scale amateur sport event in Japan.

The tournament, organized by the Japan College School Volleyball Federation and Asahi Shimbun, takes place in December at Tokyo Metropolitan Gymnasium.

Previous winners
Men

Women

References

Volleyball competitions in Japan
Student sport in Japan
Recurring sporting events established in 1948
1948 establishments in Japan